Caudalejeunea grolleana is a species of liverwort in the family Lejeuneaceae. It is endemic to Madagascar. Its natural habitat is subtropical or tropical dry forests. It is threatened by habitat loss. This liverwort can be found on tree bark and dead wood in undisturbed lowland rainforest. The main threat to the species is deforestation. Its habitat in Madagascar has a tropical to sub-tropical climate.

This species was first described in 1974.

References

Lejeuneaceae
Endemic flora of Madagascar
Endangered plants
Taxonomy articles created by Polbot